The Eugene M. Emme Award is an award given annually to a person or persons selected by a panel of reviewers from the American Astronautical Society History Committee to recognize "the truly outstanding book published each year serving public understanding about the positive impact of astronautics upon society." The award is in honor of Eugene M. Emme, NASA's first historian.

List of recipients
Source: American Astronautical Society

2021 - The Burning Blue: The Untold Story of Christa McAuliffe and NASA’s Challenger Disaster by Kevin Cook
2020 - Operation Moonglow: A Political History of Project Apollo (Basic Books) by Teasel Muir-Harmony
2019
 NASA and the Long Civil Rights Movement (University Press Florida) by Brian C. Odom and Stephen R. Waring
 Moonbound: Apollo 11 and the Dream of Spaceflight (Hill & Wang) by Jonathan Fetter-Vorm
2018 - Ronald Reagan and the Space Frontier (Palgrave) by John Logsdon
2017 - Apollo in the Age of Aquarius (Harvard University Press) by Neil M. Maher
2016 (Awarded September 2017) - How to Make a Spaceship: A Band of Renegades, an Epic Race, and the Birth of Private Spaceflight (Penguin Press) by Julian Guthrie 
2015 - German Rocketeers in the Heart of Dixie – Making Sense of the Nazi Past during the Civil Rights Era (Yale University Press) by Monique Laney
2014 - Mars Up Close: Inside the Curiosity Mission (National Geographic) by Marc Kaufman
2013 - Dreams of Other Worlds: The Amazing Story of Unmanned Space Exploration (Princeton University Press) by Chris Impey and Holly Henry
2012 The Visioneers: How A Group of Elite Scientists Pursued Space Colonies, Nanotechnologies, and a Limitless Future (Princeton University Press) by W. Patrick McCrayDestined for Space: Our Story of Exploration (Smithsonian Books and Capstone) by Don Nardo (Children's Category)Spacesuit: A History of Fact and Fiction (Casemate Publishers) by Brett Goodin (Young Adult Category)
2011
 Spacesuit: Fashioning Apollo (The MIT Press) by Nicholas de Monchaux
 The Scientists Behind Space (Heinemann Raintree, an imprint of Capstone) by Eve Hartman (Children's Category)
 Man on the Moon: How a Photograph Made Anything Seem Possible (Compass Point, an imprint of Capstone) by Pamela Dell (Young Adults Category)
 2010
 John F. Kennedy and the Race to the Moon (Palgrave Macmillan) by John M. Logsdon
 The Red Rockets' Glare: Spaceflight and the Soviet Imagination, 1857-1957 (Cambridge University Press) by Asif A. Siddiqi
 Eight Great Planets! (Picture Window Books) by Laura Purdie Salas (Children’s Category)
 This is Rocket Science: True Stories of the Risk-taking Scientists who Figure Out Ways to Explore Beyond Earth (National Geographic Children's Books) by Gloria Skurzynski (Young Adult Category)
2009
 Ambassadors from Earth: Pioneering Explorations with Unmanned Spacecraft (University of Nebraska Press) by Jay Gallentine 
 If I Were an Astronaut (Picture Window Books) by Eric Braun (Children’s Category) 
 Whatever Happened to the World of Tomorrow? (Abrams ComicArts) by Brian Fies (Young Adult Category)
2008 – Digital Apollo: Human and Machines in Spaceflight - David A. Mindell
2007 – Von Braun: Dreamer of Space, Engineer of War - Michael J. Neufeld
2006 - Into the Black: JPL and the American Space Program, 1976-2004 - Peter W. Westwick
2006 - Honorable Mention - Testing the Limits - Aviation Medicine and the Origins of Manned Space Flight - Maura Mackowski
2005 - First Man: The Life of Neil A. Armstrong - James R. Hansen
2004 - Right Stuff, Wrong Sex: America’s First Women in Space Program - Margaret Weitekamp
2003 - Leaving Earth: Space Stations, Rival Superpowers, and the Quest for Interpanetary Travel - Robert F. Zimmerman
2002 - The Secret of Apollo: Systems Management in American and European Space Programs - Stephen B. Johnson
2001 - Moon Lander: How We Developed the Apollo Lunar Module - Thomas J. Kelly
2000 - Challenge to Apollo: The Soviet Union and the Space Race, 1945- 1974 - Asif Azam Siddiqi
1999 - America's Space Sentinels: DSP Satellites and National Security - Jeffrey T. Richelson
1998 - This New Ocean: The Story of the First Space Age - William E. Burrows
1997 - Space and the American Imagination - Howard E. McCurdy
1996 - Blind Watchers of the Sky: The People and Ideas that Shaped Our View of the Universe - Edward W. "Rocky" Kolb
1995 - Spaceflight Revolution: NASA Langley Research Center from Sputnik to Apollo - James R. Hansen
1994 - International Cooperation in Space: The Example of the European Space Agency - Roger M. Bonnet and Vittorio Manno
1993 - The Sputnik Challenge: Eisenhower's Response to the Soviet Satellite - Robert A. Divine
1992 - Blueprint for Space: From Science Fiction to Science Fact - Frederick I. Ordway III and Randy Liebermann
1991 - Exploring the Sun: Solar Science Since Galileo - Karl Hufbauer
1990 - The Home Planet - Kevin W. Kelley1989 - Journey Into Space: The First Thirty Years of Space Exploration - Bruce C. Murray
1988 - No award given
1987 - Before Lift Off - Henry S. F. Cooper Jr.
1986 - Pioneering the Space Frontier: Report of the National Commission on Space - National Commission on Space
1985 - Beachheads in Space - Jerry Grey
1984 - 2010: Space Odyssey Two - Arthur C. Clarke
1983 - Global Talk'' - Joseph N. Pelton

See also
 American Astronautical Society
 List of history awards
 List of space technology awards

References

External links
Eugene M. Award from the American Astronautical Society

American non-fiction literary awards
History awards
Awards established in 1983
Awards of the American Astronautical Society